Chloralodol (Chlorhexadol) is a hypnotic/sedative. It is a Schedule III drug in the USA; however, it is not currently marketed in the United States so it is no longer prescribed.

References

Hypnotics
Sedatives
Organochlorides
Ethers
GABAA receptor positive allosteric modulators